Sannella could refer to one of the following people:
 Andy Sannella - musician who played on many jazz and dance band records from the 1920s
 Donald Sannella - professor at the University of Edinburgh; son of Ted Sannella
 Ted Sannella - contra dance and square dance caller; social dance choreographer; father of Donald Sannella
 Della Sannella - ancient name of the Simonetti family from Florence, mentioned in Dante's Divine Comedy

 other
 Sannella (genus), an insect genus in the tribe Typhlocybini